Coaldale is an unincorporated community in Mercer County, West Virginia, United States.

Coaldale was so named on account of the local coal-mining industry.

References

Unincorporated communities in Mercer County, West Virginia
Unincorporated communities in West Virginia